Delhi Cantonment (popularly referred to as Delhi Cantt) is a Class I Cantonment Board established in 1914.

The Cantonment is governed by the Cantonments Act, 2006 while various policy letters and instructions from the Ministry of Defence pertaining to the area are issued from time to time. Although the board functions as a local municipal body, it remains under the administrative control of the Directorate General Defence Estates, New Delhi and Principal Director, Defence Estates, Western Command, Chandigarh.

It is one of three local bodies in the National Capital Territory of Delhi, the others being Municipal Corporation of Delhi and New Delhi Municipal Council.

History
Cantonments in Delhi and Ahmedabad were originally established by the British. The Delhi Cantonment houses the Indian Army Headquarters, Delhi Area; the Army Golf Course; the Defence Services Officers Institute; military housing; Army and Air Force Public Schools; and various other defence-related installations. The cantonment also houses the Army Hospital Research and Referral, a tertiary care medical centre of the armed forces of India.

There is a railway station within the cantonment, Delhi Cantonment railway station, from where trains depart for various parts of the country.

Demographics
At the 2001 India census Delhi Cantt. had a population of 124,452. Males constituted 61% of the population and females 39%. Delhi Cantt. has an average literacy rate of 77%, higher than the national average of 74%: male literacy is 83% and, female literacy is 68%. In Delhi Cantt., 12% of the population is under 6 years of age.

At the 2011 India census Delhi Cantt. had a population of 116,352. Males constituted ≈58% (67,703) of the population and females constituted ≈42% (48,649). Delhi Cantt. has an average literacy rate of 91.11%, higher than the national average of 79.9%: male literacy is 94.54% and, female literacy is 86.26%. In Delhi Cantt., 11.36% of the population is under 6 years of age.

Facilities
 is located in Delhi Cantonment.

Transport
Delhi Cantonment is connected by road, railway and air. Indira Gandhi International Airport is about 5 kilometres from Delhi Cantonment. Its nearest metro stations are Delhi Cantonment, Sadar Bazaar Cantonment and Shankar Vihar metro station. Delhi Cantonment has a railway station. Almost all the trains plying from Delhi towards Rajasthan or Gujarat stop here.

It is easily accessible by road and local bus to the residents of nearby residential neighbourhoods such as Palam, Dwarka, Dhaula Kuan, Tilak Nagar, Vasant Vihar, Naraina and Janakpuri.

References

Neighbourhoods in Delhi
District subdivisions of Delhi
Local government in Delhi
Cantonments of India
Cantonments of British India
1914 establishments in India